The Royal Air Force Search and Rescue Force (SARF or SAR Force) was the Royal Air Force organisation which provided around-the-clock aeronautical search and rescue cover in the United Kingdom, Cyprus and the Falkland Islands, from 1986 until 2016.

The Search and Rescue Force was established in 1986 from the helicopter elements of the RAF Marine Branch which was disbanded that year. The Force supported search and rescue over the United Kingdom until 4 October 2015 when the role was handed over to civilian contractor Bristow Helicopters.

On 18 February 2016, the force's disbandment was officially marked with a parade in front of The Duke of Cambridge, who was a former SAR pilot, and Catherine, Duchess of Cambridge, his wife.

History

In 1918 the RAF was established through the merging of the aviation arms of the Royal Navy, the Royal Navy Air Service (RNAS), and that of the Army, the Royal Flying Corps. Together with its aircraft, vessels acquired to support RAF seaplane operations were also transferred to the new service, becoming the Marine Craft Section (MCS),

Post-war the MCS became a force of 150 vessels which in addition to supporting the operation of seaplanes were equipped for rescue operations, with a launch being at the ready whenever an aircraft was flying over water. However, the training and seamanship of the crews, especially with regards to navigation, meant that the MCS at this time was only suitable for inshore rescue operations.

As the vessels it had inherited from the Navy began wear out the RAF began to have built for it launches capable of higher speeds and in light of the larger crews of some aircraft, greater capacity. This would in the late 1930s lead to the acquiring of High Speed Launches (HSL) for rescue operations.

However, during the Second World War the MCS found itself ill-prepared for war. During the Battle of Britain even with the help of civilian vessels and the Royal Navy, aircrew who baled out or ditched in the North Sea and English Channel had only a 20 percent chance of being returned to their squadrons, with over 200 pilots and aircrew being lost to the sea during the battle. An informal air-sea rescue was started in July 1940 by Flying Officer Russell Aitken, who with the approval of his senior officer at RAF Gosport, began flying a Supermarine Walrus to rescue pilots downed in the English Channel. By the end of August, when he ceased this work, he had rescued around 35 British and German aircrew.

In light of this, in 1941, an emergency meeting was convened by Air Marshal Sir Arthur "Bomber" Harris. The Royal Navy offered to take over in its entirety the at sea rescue role, the RAF declined and subsequently created the Directorate of Air Sea Rescue on 6 February 1941, which adopted the motto "The sea shall not have them". Operationally it was to become known as Air Sea Rescue Services (ASRS), which later became the RAF Search and Rescue Force. The headquarters of the ASRS was co-located with that of Coastal Command with which it operated closely.

Together with creation of specialist Air Sea Rescue Units (ASRU), ASRS worked to improve the survival of aircrews through the development and issue of better individual survival equipment, including one man inflatable dinghies for fighter pilots copied from the Germans; the training of aircrew in ditching drills to maximise their chances of surviving to be retrieved; the development and fielding of air droppable survival equipment; and coordination between the different services, branches and units towards the goal of locating and recovering of downed airmen.

The air-sea rescue squadrons of the ASRS flew a variety of aircraft, usually hand me downs rejected or withdrawn from front line service by the RAF's other branches or as in the case of the Walrus begged from the Navy. They used Supermarine Spitfires and Boulton Paul Defiants to patrol for downed aircrew and Avro Ansons to drop supplies and dinghies. Supermarine Walrus and Supermarine Sea Otter amphibious craft were used to pick up aircrew from the water. Larger aircraft were used to drop airborne lifeboats. Although the Walrus and Sea Otters could pick up survivors close to shore and in coastal waters further out to sea it was still not possible for aircraft to routinely pick up survivors, the large flying boats that could do so, such as the Consolidated Catalinas and Short Sunderlands of Coastal Command, had many other jobs to do and were not always available. The role of aircraft in the ASRS therefore, was to locate downed airmen and to keep them alive, by dropping them survival equipment and stores, until an ASRS launch, or one from the Royal Navy's Naval Sea Rescue Services, arrived to pick them up. Generally MCS craft had responsibility for the Channel and North Sea, and Navy ones for the Western Approaches.

By the end of the Second World War, more than 8,000 aircrew and 5,000 civilians had been rescued. At the end of the Second World War the MCS had some 300 HSLs and over a thousand other vessels, the largest fleet of such rescue craft in the world. This fleet and the RAF sailors that crewed it would contract as the RAF did, however it continued be found everywhere that the RAF flew over water.

Introduction of helicopters

In the mid 1950s, helicopters began to replace fixed–wing aircraft and supplement the marine craft in the search and rescue role, their ability to hover giving them an ability to recover survivors that fixed wing aircraft did not have. It was not until the 1960s, with the introduction of the Westland Whirlwind, the Westland Wessex and later the Westland Sea King, that it was possible to replace marine craft in all sea and weather conditions. Helicopters have the advantage of speed, which means that the same coverage as marine craft can be provided with far fewer bases and much reduced personnel numbers. However, even into the 1970s helicopters had not completely replaced RAF marine craft, however by this time the MCS craft were becoming increasingly elderly and service in the MCS increasingly unattractive.

In 1986 the Marine Branch was disbanded, the last of the RAF's vessels were retired. Henceforth the RAF's rescue operations would be entirely helicopter based, Air Sea Rescue Services would be renamed the Search and Rescue Force.

Role

The SARF's primary roles were military search and rescue, and the provision of rescue for civilian aircraft in distress under the 1948 Chicago Convention. The latter was a delegated responsibility to the UK MoD from the Department of Transport, who had primary responsibility for general search and rescue of any type throughout the UK Search and Rescue Region (UK SRR). The military role involved the rescuing of aircrew who have ejected or parachuted from, or crash-landed their aircraft. This role raises the wartime combat effectiveness of the RAF (and RN) by enabling downed aircrew to be returned to front-line flying duties as soon as possible.

Although established with a primary role of military search and rescue, most of SARF's operational missions were spent in its secondary role, conducting civil search and rescue. This entails the rescue of civilians from the sea, on mountains, from flooded regions or other locations on land.

The aeronautical search and rescue roles were complemented by the related Royal Air Force Mountain Rescue Service whose trained mountaineers also conduct search and rescue in hilly terrain. SARF helicopters and RAF mountaineers often work together on mountain rescue incidents.

The military and civil roles were shared with the Sea King helicopters of the Royal Navy's Fleet Air Arm, while the civil search and rescue role was also shared with the helicopters of HM Coastguard.

Organization

Search and Rescue Wing

The wing was formed at RAF Finningley on 1 September 1976.

Search and Rescue Training Unit

The Search and Rescue Training Unit was formed on 3 December 1979.

No. 22 Squadron RAF
February 1955 - June 1955 - HQ at RAF Thorney Island
 Bristol Sycamore HC.12
June 1955 - June 1956 - HQ at RAF Thorney Island
 Westland Whirlwind HAR.2

June 1956 - April 1974 - HQ at RAF St Mawgan
 Westland Whirlwind HAR.2 until August 1962 replaced by Whirlwind HAR.10s from August 1962

April 1974 - January 1976 - HQ at RAF Thorney Island
 Whirlwind HAR.10

January 1976 - June 1976 - HQ at RAF Finningley
 Whirlwind HAR.10

June 1976 - unknown - HQ at RAF Finningley
 Westland Wessex HAR.2

unknown - unknown - HQ at RAF St Mawgan
 Westland Sea King HAR.3

Unknown - October 2015 - HQ at RAF Valley
 Westland Sea King HAR.3

No. 110 Squadron RAF
3 June 1959 – 15 February 1971 - HQ at RAF Kuala Lumpur
 Whirlwind HC.4/HAR.10 & Sycamore HR.13(April 1960-October 1964)

No. 202 Squadron RAF

August 1964 - September 1976 - HQ at RAF Leconfield
 Whirlwind HAR.10

September 1976 - July 1978 - HQ at RAF Finningley
 Whirlwind HAR.10

July 1978 – 1 December 1992 - HQ at RAF Finningley
 Whirlwind HAR.10 until November 1979, Westland Sea King HAR.3 & Westland Wessex HAR.2

1 December 1992 - April 2008 - HQ at RAF Boulmer
 Westland Sea King HAR.3

April 2008 - October 2015 - HQ at RAF Valley
 Westland Sea King HAR.3

No. 228 Squadron RAF
September 1959 - August 1964 - HQ at RAF Leconfield
 Bristol Sycamore & Westland Whirlwind

Disbanded into 202 Squadron

No. 275 Squadron RAF
15 October 1941 - April 1944 - HQ at RAF Valley
 Westland Lysander, Supermarine Walrus, Boulton Paul Defiant, Supermarine Spitfire & Avro Anson

April 1944 - August 1944 - HQ at RAF Warmwell

7 August1944 - 18 October 1944 - HQ at RAF Bolt Head

18 October 1944 – 10 January 1945 - HQ at RAF Exeter

10 January 1945 – 15 February1945 - HQ at RAF Harrowbeer

Disbanded between 1945 & 1953

1 March 1953 – 18 November 1954 - HQ at RAF Linton-on-Ouse
 Bristol Sycamore HR.13/HR.14

18 November 1954 – 9 October 1957 - HQ at RAF Thornaby

9 October 1957 – 1 September 1959 - HQ at RAF Leconfield
 Converted to Whirlwind HAR.2/HAR.4 in March 1959

Disbanded into 228 Squadron

No. 276 Squadron RAF
21 October 1941 - September 1944 - HQ at RAF Harrowbeer
 Lysander, Walrus, Hurricanes, Defiants, Spitfires and Ansons
 Vickers Warwicks replaced Ansons from April 1944

September 1944 - Unknown - HQ at Querqueville
 Lysander, Walrus, Hurricanes, Defiants, Spitfires and Warwicks
 Warwicks handed over to 277 Squadron in October 1944

Unknown - 23 August 1945 - HQ in Belgium

23 August 1945 – 10 November 1945 - HQ at Kjevik, Norway

10 November 1945 – 14 November 1945 - HQ at RAF Dunsfold

No. 277 Squadron RAF
22 December 1941 – 26 February 1945 - HQ at RAF Stapleford Tawney
 Lysander, Walrus, Defiant, Spitfire, Sea Otter & Warwick

Detachments at RAF Martlesham Heath, RAF Hawkinge, RAF Shoreham and RAF Tangmere.

No. 278 Squadron RAF

No. 279 Squadron RAF
16 November 1941 - October 1944 - HQ at RAF Bircham Newton
 Lockheed Hudson

October 1944 - September 1945 - HQ at RAF Thornaby
 Vickers Warwick

3 September 1945 – 10 March 1946 - HQ at RAF Beccles

No. 280 Squadron RAF

No. 281 Squadron RAF

No. 282 Squadron RAF

No. 283 Squadron RAF

No. 284 Squadron RAF

2015

The SAR Force headquarters was situated at RAF Valley on Anglesey. In addition to the Force HQ proper, the HQ building housed the HQs of the RAFs two operational SAR squadrons in the UK (22 and 202), as well as the RAF Sea King Simulator. SAR Force HQ controlled the SAR Force's three helicopter squadrons and one independent flight. These were:
 No. 22 Squadron equipped with the Sea King HAR.3/HAR.3A. 
 No. 202 Squadron equipped with the Sea King HAR.3.
 No. 84 Squadron based at RAF Akrotiri in Cyprus and equipped with the Griffin HAR.2.
 No. 1564 Flight based at RAF Mount Pleasant in the Falkland Islands and equipped with the Sea King HAR.3.

SARF's Operational Conversion Unit was No. 203 Squadron also based at RAF Valley and equipped with the Sea King HAR.3.

Coordination
In the UK, maritime search and rescue is coordinated by HM Coastguard, while land-based operations are usually coordinated by the local Police force.

From 1941 until the end of 1997 there were two Aeronautical Rescue Coordination Centres (ARCC) – at Plymouth and at Edinburgh. These two were combined in 1997 at RAF Kinloss in the north of Scotland. All requests for assistance from the emergency services throughout the United Kingdom (Police, Fire, Ambulance and Coastguard) were handled at this single ARCC until March 2016 when responsibility for the service was transferred to civilian personnel of Her Majesty's Coastguard.

Disbandment

In 2006, the government announced controversial plans to effectively privatise provision of search and rescue helicopters in order to replace the ageing Sea Kings, although they have suggested that crews may, at least partially, still be made up of military personnel.

In February 2010, Soteria SAR was announced as the preferred bidder for the UK SAR programme. On 8 February 2011, days before the contract was due to be signed, the UK Government halted the process after Soteria admitted that it had unauthorised access to commercially sensitive information regarding the programme.

While this contract is being renegotiated, a "Gap" contract was tendered for the existing Maritime and Coastguard Agency (MCA) bases and in February 2012 it was announced that Bristow Helicopters would take over the running of Stornoway and Sumburgh using Sikorsky S-92s and that Portland and Lee on Solent would be retained by CHC Helicopter using AgustaWestland AW139s.

In March 2013 the Department for Transport announced that it had signed a contract with Bristow Helicopters Ltd to provide search and rescue helicopter services in the UK with operations commencing progressively from 2015. The new service was fully operational across the United Kingdom by May 2019 and will use AgustaWestland AW189 and Sikorsky S-92 based at ten locations around the UK.

See also
 History of Royal Navy Helicopter Search and Rescue
 Rescue

References

Citations

Bibliography

External links

 
 

Military units and formations of the Royal Air Force
Rescue aviation units and formations
Emergency services in the United Kingdom
Sea rescue in the United Kingdom
1941 establishments in the United Kingdom
Military units and formations established in 1941